Bah Bill Abuza Mamadou (born 8 September 2001), commonly known as Bill Mamadou, is a Singaporean footballer currently playing as a midfielder for Lion City Sailors FC. He is the son of former footballer Bah Mamadou.

Career

Home United
In 2019, he was promoted to the 1st team and played a total of 3 matches for the protectors.

Young Lions
After enlistment, he played for the Young Lions Team for 2 years from 2020 to 2021.

Lion City Sailors
He played for the Sailors after his completion of the NS.  He made his season debut against Tanjong Pagar in a 7-0 at the Jalan Besar Stadium on 13 August for their second big-margin win for the season.  

For the match against Albriex, Harris was suspended and Pedro was injured for the match, which resulted in Bill starting the 1st of many matches for the season

Career statistics

Club

Notes

References

Living people
2001 births
Singaporean footballers
Guinean footballers
Association football midfielders
Singapore Premier League players
Home United FC players
Lion City Sailors FC players
Young Lions FC players
Singaporean people of Guinean descent
Singapore youth international footballers